Since 1979 one third of Ipswich Borough Council is elected each year, followed by one year without election.

Political control

Leadership
The leaders of the council since 2001 have been:

Council elections
1973 Ipswich Borough Council election
1976 Ipswich Borough Council election
1979 Ipswich Borough Council election (New ward boundaries)
1980 Ipswich Borough Council election
1982 Ipswich Borough Council election
1983 Ipswich Borough Council election
1984 Ipswich Borough Council election
1986 Ipswich Borough Council election (Borough boundary changes took place but the number of seats remained the same)
1987 Ipswich Borough Council election
1988 Ipswich Borough Council election
1990 Ipswich Borough Council election
1991 Ipswich Borough Council election
1992 Ipswich Borough Council election
1994 Ipswich Borough Council election
1995 Ipswich Borough Council election
1996 Ipswich Borough Council election
1998 Ipswich Borough Council election
1999 Ipswich Borough Council election
2000 Ipswich Borough Council election
2002 Ipswich Borough Council election (New ward boundaries)
2003 Ipswich Borough Council election
2004 Ipswich Borough Council election
2006 Ipswich Borough Council election
2007 Ipswich Borough Council election
2008 Ipswich Borough Council election
2010 Ipswich Borough Council election
2011 Ipswich Borough Council election
2012 Ipswich Borough Council election
2014 Ipswich Borough Council election
2015 Ipswich Borough Council election
2016 Ipswich Borough Council election
2018 Ipswich Borough Council election
2019 Ipswich Borough Council election
2021 Ipswich Borough Council election
2022 Ipswich Borough Council election

Result maps

Election apportionment diagrams

By-election results

References

External links
Ipswich Borough Council

 
Elections in Ipswich
Council elections in Suffolk
District council elections in England